Earnside Castle was a 15th-century castle, about  north-east of Forres, Moray, Scotland, and north of Alves Wood.
It may be known as Ernside Castle.

The Cumyns of Altyr built the castle around 1450. There is no longer any significant trace of the castle. However, a large oblong cropmark, with some small oblongs in it, is visible and may be associated with it.

See also
Castles in Great Britain and Ireland
List of castles in Scotland

References

Castles in Moray
Listed castles in Scotland
Ruined castles in Scotland